Christine Margery Gwyther (born 1959) is a Welsh Labour politician. She won the Carmarthen West and South Pembrokeshire constituency seat in the first National Assembly for Wales elections in 1999 and held it until 2007. She lost her seat in the 2007 Welsh Assembly Elections, to Conservative candidate Angela Burns.

Background
Gwyther was born in Pembroke Dock. Before going into politics, she worked as a Pembrokeshire County Council Development Officer.

Political career
During the first term of the Assembly, Gwyther was the Minister of Agriculture under the leadership of Alun Michael. She is a vegetarian and as a result was criticised by some farmers and opposition parties.  She introduced organic, dairy, red meat and diversification support, as well as a sustainable development scheme for Wales.

In 2000, on the eve of the Royal Welsh Show, she was dismissed from her post as Welsh agriculture minister by First Minister, Rhodri Morgan.

For most of her years at the National Assembly Christine Gwyther chaired the Economic Development and Transport Committee.  She was a founder member of the National Assembly Sustainable Energy Group.

She was one of two candidates to be nominated for the 2012 Police and Crime Commissioner for the Dyfed–Powys Police region, losing to the Conservative Christopher Salmon.

References

External links
Assembly Bio
Welsh Labour Bio

1959 births
Living people
Wales AMs 1999–2003
Wales AMs 2003–2007
Welsh Labour members of the Senedd
Members of the Welsh Assembly Government
People from Pembroke Dock